Donald David Phillips (born ) is a Canadian Anglican bishop who was the Bishop of Rupert's Land from 2000 until 2018. Phillips was educated at the University of Western Ontario and ordained in 1981. He was at Lac La Biche, Alberta, until 1984 and then priest in charge at St Thomas' Fort McMurray. He also held ministry positions at St Paul's Fort Chipewyan and St Michael and All Angels' Moose Jaw before becoming Ministries Development Co-ordinator in 1992. He was ordained to the episcopate in 2000. His term as diocesan bishop concluded in November 2018.

References

Year of birth missing
20th-century Canadian Christian clergy
21st-century Anglican Church of Canada bishops
Anglican bishops of Rupert's Land
People from London, Ontario
University of Western Ontario alumni